Vitaliy Medzhidovich Rahimov ( born 27 August 1984, Meghri, Armenian SSR) is an Azerbaijani athlete.

Rahimov moved with his family to Azerbaijan in 1990. He has been trained in Greco-Roman wrestling since 1994. He made the Azerbaijani Olympic teams in 2004 and 2008. In the 2004 Olympics in Athens, Rahimov beat Jim Gruenwald of the United States (7-0) but was later defeated by the Serbian Davor Stefanek.

In the 2008 Beijing Olympics, Rahimov reached the final having beaten Sheng Jiang (China), Eusebiu Diaconu (Romania), Armen Nazaryan (Bulgaria), and Nurbakyt Tengizbayev (Turkmenistan) but lost to Islambek Albiev from Russia. On 17 November 2016 the IOC disqualified him from the 2008 Olympic Games, stripped his Olympic silver medal and struck his results from the record for failing a drugs test in a re-analysis of his doping sample from 2008.

References

External links
 

1984 births
Living people
People from Meghri
Azerbaijani male sport wrestlers
Olympic wrestlers of Azerbaijan
Wrestlers at the 2004 Summer Olympics
Wrestlers at the 2008 Summer Olympics
World Wrestling Championships medalists
Competitors stripped of Summer Olympics medals
Doping cases in wrestling
Azerbaijani sportspeople in doping cases
European Wrestling Championships medalists
21st-century Azerbaijani people